Mount Zion Silver Jubilee Matriculation Higher Secondary School (MZSJHSS) was established in the year 2015 at Sivagangai, Tamil Nadu, India. It is being run by the Mount Zion Christian Educational Research and Charitable Trust.

From 2022 onwards, it is affiliated to the Central Board of Secondary Education, New Delhi. It is a Senior Secondary School which offers classes from Kindergarten to 12th Standard.

Recognition

The school is recognized by the Government of Tamil Nadu and is affiliated to CBSE, New Delhi.

References

External links
Mount Zion Silver Jubilee School Official

Educational institutions established in 2015
2015 establishments in Tamil Nadu